The 1969 Toronto Argonauts finished in second place in the Eastern Conference with a 10–4 record. They appeared in the Eastern Finals.

Regular season

Standings

Schedule

Postseason

References

Toronto Argonauts seasons
1969 Canadian Football League season by team